The Hella Mega Tour was a concert tour by American rock bands Green Day, Fall Out Boy, and Weezer that was announced on September 10, 2019 and originally included dates from March to August 2020. Due to the COVID-19 pandemic, the Oceania and Asian legs of the tour were canceled, as well as some European dates and the sole Canadian date. The rest of the tour was rescheduled to 2021 and 2022.

Background 
On September 10, 2019, all three bands simultaneously announced the tour and new music. On the same day, each band also released a new single: Green Day released "Father of All..." and announced its 13th album, Father of All Motherfuckers; Fall Out Boy released "Dear Future Self (Hands Up)" and announced its second compilation album, Greatest Hits: Believers Never Die – Volume Two; and Weezer released "The End of the Game" and announced its fifteenth (fourteenth at the time) album, Van Weezer. Weezer would also go on to release their fourteenth studio album OK Human on January 29, 2021, preceded eight days earlier by the lead single "All My Favorite Songs".

Overview 
All three bands performed at 29 shows across the North American and European legs.  The venues consisted of outdoor and indoor arenas as well as outdoor park venues. On February 28, 2020, Green Day announced all nine Asia tour dates were postponed due to the COVID-19 pandemic. On April 23, 2020, it was announced on the social media pages of the Hella Mega Tour that a number of the European dates would be postponed. On May 19, 2020, it was announced that all dates on the North American leg would be postponed to 2021. On July 15, 2020, it was announced that all dates on the Oceania leg would be cancelled and tickets refunded. On February 27, 2022, Green Day announced their solo concert in Moscow prior to the European Hella Mega Tour leg on May 29 would be canceled due to the 2022 Russian invasion of Ukraine.

Set list 

This set list is from the concert on July 24, 2021, in Arlington, Texas. It is not intended to represent all shows from the tour.

Tour dates

Cancelled shows

Personnel

Weezer
 Brian Bell – lead and rhythm guitar, backing vocals, keyboards
 Rivers Cuomo – lead vocals, lead and rhythm guitar, drum solo on "Africa"
 Scott Shriner – bass, backing vocals, synthesizers
 Patrick Wilson – drums
Additional musician
 Dave Eltich – drums (filled in for Wilson in European leg)

Fall Out Boy
 Andy Hurley – drums, percussion, backing vocals
 Patrick Stump – lead vocals, rhythm guitar, piano
 Joe Trohman – lead guitar, backing vocals
 Pete Wentz – bass, backing vocals

Green Day
 Billie Joe Armstrong – lead vocals, harmonica, lead and rhythm guitars
 Mike Dirnt – bass, backing vocals
 Tré Cool – drums, percussion
Additional musicians
 Jason White – lead and rhythm guitars, backing vocals
 Jason Freese – keyboards, piano, saxophone, accordion, backing vocals
 Kevin Tyler Preston – rhythm guitar, acoustic guitar, backing vocals

Promotional performances 
Green Day, Fall Out Boy and Weezer arranged performances to promote the tour as follows:

 September 10, 2019 – All three bands played at a tour announcement show at the Whisky a Go Go in West Hollywood, California, United States
 September 11, 2019 – Weezer at Jimmy Kimmel Live! at the El Capitan Entertainment Centre in Los Angeles, United States
 September 11, 2019 – Fall Out Boy at Jimmy Kimmel Live! at the El Capitan Entertainment Centre in Los Angeles, United States
 September 12, 2019 – Green Day at Jimmy Kimmel Live! at the El Capitan Entertainment Centre in Los Angeles, United States
 September 20, 2019 – Green Day at the iHeartRadio Music Festival at T-Mobile Arena in Paradise, Nevada, United States
 October 9, 2019 – Green Day at The Howard Stern Show at SiriusXM Hollywood in Los Angeles, United States
 October 25, 2019 – Green Day at Kevin and Bean at the HD Radio Sound Space at Live House Hollywood in Los Angeles, United States
 October 30, 2019  – Green Day at La Riviera in Madrid, Spain
 November 2, 2019 – Green Day at the 2019 MTV Europe Music Awards World Stage at the Plaza de España in Seville, Spain
 November 11, 2019 – Fall Out Boy at The Showbox in Seattle
 November 24, 2019 – Green Day at the American Music Awards of 2019 at the Microsoft Theater in Los Angeles, United States
 December 12, 2019 – Green Day at The Game Awards 2019 at the Microsoft Theater in Los Angeles, United States
 December 31, 2019 – Green Day at Dick Clark's New Year's Rockin' Eve in Hollywood, California, United States
 January 25, 2020 – Green Day played two performances for the 2020 National Hockey League All-Star Game, both outside and inside the Enterprise Center in St. Louis, United States
 February 6, 2020 – Green Day at The Ellen DeGeneres Show at Warner Bros. Studios in Burbank, California, United States
 February 7, 2020 – Green Day at the iHeartRadio Theater Los Angeles in Burbank, California, United States
 February 10, 2020 – Green Day at Good Morning America at the El Capitan Entertainment Centre in Hollywood, California, United States
 February 10, 2020 – Green Day at The Late Late Show with James Corden at CBS Television City in Los Angeles, United States
 June 17, 2020 – Weezer at The Tonight Show Starring Jimmy Fallon
 February 6, 2021 – Green Day at the 10th Annual NFL Honors at SoFi Stadium in Inglewood, California, United States
 May 7, 2021 – Weezer at the iHeartRadio Theater Los Angeles
 May 10, 2021 – Weezer at The Tonight Show Starring Jimmy Fallon
 June 23, 2021 – Weezer at Late Night with Seth Meyers
 July 16, 2021 – Weezer and Fall Out Boy at Good Morning America
 July 20, 2021 – Green Day at Cain's Ballroom in Tulsa, Oklahoma, United States

Notes

References

External links 
 

Co-headlining concert tours
Fall Out Boy
Green Day concert tours
Weezer
Concert tours postponed due to the COVID-19 pandemic
2021 concert tours
2022 concert tours